Keezhoor (kee-zh-oor) is a small village located in the Kottayam District in the southern state of Kerala, India. It is within the Mulakulam panchayat and Tehsil Vaikom Thaluk (administrative districts). It is located on the main road connecting the larger towns of Peruva (1½ miles east) and Thalayolaparambu (2½  miles west).

History
The initial settlers probably arrived in Keezhoor in the early-to-mid-19th century.  Agriculture has been the major economic activity for the people of Keezhoor. In the past three decades immigration to the Persian Gulf, the US and to the UK by medical and other professionals has changed the face of Keezhoor significantly.

Schools    
Govt. Lower Primary school, Planchuvadu 
St. Joseph CBSE School Planchuvadu, Keezhoor 
St. Joseph UP school, Arunnoottimangalam

Colleges    
DB College Keezhoor, Thalayolapparambu

Places of worship
 Keezhoor Devi Kshetram
 Keezhoor Dharma Shasta Temple
 Mount Carmel Church, Keezhoor

References

Villages in Kottayam district